Tampa Bay Technical High School (TBT) is a public comprehensive magnet high school for grades 9–12 in Florida, United States. It  was established in 1969 as Tampa Bay Vocational Technical School. The school mascot is the Titan.

Students apply for one of  three programs: Tampa Bay Technical High School Programs, Academy of Architecture & Environmental Design, or Academy of Health Professions. The school campus resembles a community college campus with laboratory facilities for technology programs. Transportation is provided by the Hillsborough County Public Schools through a bus transfer system.

Demographics
Tampa Bay Tech HS is 48.7% Black, 29.8% Hispanic, 13.4% White, 4.0% Asian, 3.9% multiracial, and .2% other

Academics
In 2015–2016 Tampa Bay Technical High School had a graduation rate of 95%, and 75% of students were enrolled in Advanced Placement courses, with 41% passing. Dual enrollment courses are available through Hillsborough Community College.

The school offers the following programs:

Technology programs
Auto Body Repair
Automotive Repair
Air Conditioning (HVAC)
Architecture 
Business Education
Business Health Administration Academy
Commercial Art Academy
Computer Systems Technology
Culinary Arts
Diesel Technology
Early Childhood Education
Interior Design 
Journalism
Welding
Industrial Electricity
ROTC

Academy of Health
The Health program teaches Cardiology, Physical Therapy/Occupational Therapy, Veterinary Assistant, Medical Laboratory, Vision Specialist, Dental Aid, and Radiology and EMS Training.

Academy of Architecture
The Academy of Architecture has classes in two separate rooms, each a fully functioning lab. The students learn fundamental skills about the architecture field and practice computer-aided design as well as manual drafting. Students enter contests throughout the year, including a local drafting and design competition at the Strawberry Festival, national drafting and design competitions with SkillsUSA, and the West Point Bridge Design Contest.

Club involvement
Clubs are plentiful in the school and some nationwide clubs include chapters at Tampa Bay Tech. Clubs are divided into Career, Service, Interest and Honors Clubs.

Career clubs
HOSA (Health Occupations Students of America)
National FFA Organization (formerly known as Future Farmers of America)
FBLA (Future Business Leaders of America)
FSPA (The Florida Scholastic Press Association)
FCCLA
CAA (Commercial Arts Academy)

Notable people
Paul Ray Smith - Iraq war hero and Medal of Honor recipient 
Ted Washington - retired National Football League player
Brian Blair - professional wrestler and local politician.
Kevin Hobbs - former NFL player
Maritza Correia - swimmer, silver medalist in the 2004 Olympic Games 
Michelle Phan - makeup artist
 Deon Cain - NFL wide receiver and member of 2016 Clemson Tigers football team championship team
Kevin Jermaine "Kay-Jay" Harris - Drafted by the Texas Rangers in the 10th round of the 1997 MLB June Amateur Draft. Played college football for the West Virginia Mountaineers followed by a short stint in the NFL with the Miami Dolphins, St. Louis Rams, and New York Giants.
 Maurice Crum Jr.- Notre Dame Linebacker (2004-2008) and Defensive Coordinator for Ole Miss

References

External links
School website

Educational institutions established in 1969
High schools in Tampa, Florida
Public high schools in Florida
Charter schools in Florida
1969 establishments in Florida